Kiryat Shmuel may refer to:
 Kiryat Shmuel, Jerusalem - Neighborhood in central Jerusalem, Israel
 Kiryat Shmuel, Haifa - Neighborhood in Haifa, Israel